Mu'awiya ibn Yazid (664 – 684 CE), usually known simply as Mu'awiya II was the third Umayyad caliph. He succeeded his father Yazid I as the third caliph and last caliph of the Sufyanid line in the Umayyad dynasty. He ruled briefly in 683-684 (64 AH) before he died.

Early life
Mu'awiya was the son of Yazid I and an unknown mother from the Kalb tribe. She is often confused with Umm Hashim Fakhita bint Abi Hashim, mother of Mu'awiya's half-brother Khalid ibn Yazid.

Reign
Before Yazid I died, he had the bay'ah made to his son Mu'awiya. Mu'awiya succeeded his father in Damascus in 64 AH (November 683 CE), at an age of somewhere between 17 and 23. He was supported by the Kalb tribe, but his authority was likely only recognised in Damascus and southern Syria, with Abd Allah ibn al-Zubayr claiming the caliphate from his base in the Hejaz.

Mu'awiya's reign would have lasted for about 20 days to 4 months, but likely no more than 2 months. Given the short span of time, few events were possible, and some of those transmitted may be unreliable political and sectarian fabrications. These include:
Being a member of the Qadariyya, resulting from the belief that Mu'awiya abdicated before his death.
Denouncing his predecessors' tyranny and injustice towards the Alids.
Having the kunya Abu Layla ("Father of Layla"), a name often applied to weak persons. This was suspicious because he had no children.
Abdication before his death, originating from later Marwanid propaganda.

What does seem certain, is that Mu'awiya continued his father's policy and remitted a third of the taxes. During his reign, Mu'awiya suffered from ill health and so had to stay in the Umayyad palace in Damascus. His adviser Al-Dahhak ibn Qays al-Fihri took care of practical affairs.

Death and legacy

It is unclear how Mu'awiya died, although jaundice and a plague have been named as causes. Since he had no children and either refused or was not given the opportunity to appoint a successor, the campaigns against Ibn al-Zubayr's revolt came to a complete stop. Umayyad power temporarily collapsed until Marwan I took back control.

In his al-Futūḥāt al-Makkiyya, Ibn Arabi claimed that Muawiyya II was a spiritual Pole (Ghawth) of his time and one of the few in history having such a spiritual degree combined with a temporal power, like the Rashidun Caliphs and Umar ibn Abd al-Aziz.

References 

660s births
680s deaths
Year of birth uncertain
Year of death uncertain
7th-century Umayyad caliphs
7th-century rulers in Asia
7th-century rulers in Africa
7th-century deaths from plague (disease)